The Harcourt ministry was the combined Cabinet (formally the Executive Council of British Columbia) that governed British Columbia from November 5, 1991, to February 22, 1996. It was led by Mike Harcourt, the 30th premier of British Columbia, and consisted of members of the New Democratic Party (NDP).

The Harcourt ministry was established following the 1991 British Columbia general election, in which the NDP won a majority government. It governed for the majority of the 35th Parliament of British Columbia, until Harcourt announced his resignation in November 1995, pending a leadership election. The Harcourt ministry was disestablished on February 22, 1996, and succeeded by the Glen Clark ministry.

List of ministers

Cabinet composition and shuffles

Harcourt's initial cabinet consisted of 18 ministers. Several ministries saw their responsibilities adjusted: attorney general gained responsibility for Elections BC and the liquor distribution system, and took over all the duties of solicitor general (except for ICBC); crown lands and parks was merged into the environmental ministry; and responsibility for BC Ferries and BC Transit was moved from transportation to finance. Harcourt himself took the responsibility for the Trade Corporation. 

A then-record of seven women were appointed to cabinet, in roles that Harcourt said "will be in charge of 80 per cent of the budget of B.C." A separate ministry of women's equality was also established, following a promise that the NDP had made in 1988. In reference to this, Denise Helm of the Times Colonist remarked that "B.C. women gained unprecedented political clout" in the Harcourt ministry. Additionally, Harcourt appointed the first Indo-Canadian cabinet minister in Canada, Moe Sihota.

On September 17, 1992, forests minister Dan Miller was "suspended" from cabinet for 90 days after he was found to have been in a conflict of interest regarding forestry licences. Art Charbonneau served as forests minister during Miller's suspension. 

As part of an overall change in strategy, Harcourt initiated a major cabinet shuffle on September 15, 1993. Almost every portfolio changed hands, though Harcourt stressed that "these cabinet changes are more about me changing my attitude than the performance of individuals." Three members — Lois Boone, Anita Hagen and Tom Perry — were dropped from cabinet, and three backbenchers joined: Joy MacPhail, Jackie Pement and Paul Ramsey. The most notable change was Elizabeth Cull's promotion to deputy premier and finance minister, becoming the first woman finance minister in BC.

On March 9, 1995, Robin Blencoe resigned as government services minister, while under investigation for sexual harassment; however, Blencoe remained a member of the cabinet as minister without portfolio. Charbonneau was appointed to the ministry in the interim. After two more allegations emerged, Blencoe was removed from cabinet entirely, as well as party caucus, on April 4. Six days later, on April 10, caucus chairman Ujjal Dosanjh was named the new minister of government services, joining the cabinet.

On May 5, 1995, Sihota resigned from cabinet after being sanctioned by the BC Law Society; John Cashore stepped in as acting environment minister. A week later, Sihota's responsibilities were formally divided up among existing cabinet ministers: Cull took over as environment minister, Dosanjh took responsibility for multiculturalism and human rights, and Clark took responsibility for immigration policy. Regarding the division, Cull said she didn't "expect to carry two portfolios for an indefinite period of time." Three months later, on August 16, Sihota returned to cabinet as environment minister, though Dosanjh remained responsible for multiculturalism. Sihota's return was part of a small shuffle that also saw Colin Gabelmann and Dosanjh swap roles, with Gabelmann becoming minister of government services and Dosanjh becoming attorney general.

On October 26, 1995, Harcourt fired Joan Smallwood over her criticisms of his handling of the Bingogate scandal; she was succeeded as minister of consumer affairs by Sue Hammell.

Notes

References

Citations

Sources

Politics of British Columbia
Executive Council of British Columbia
1991 establishments in British Columbia
Cabinets established in 1991
1996 disestablishments in British Columbia
Cabinets disestablished in 1996